Fernando F. Segovia (born 1948) is a Cuban American biblical scholar, theologian, scriptural critic, and cultural critic. He is the Oberlin Graduate Professor of New Testament and Early Christianity at Vanderbilt University Divinity School. In his role as a practitioner of postcolonial biblical criticism, Segovia focuses upon the New Testament and the origins of Christianity. He is well known as a specialist in the Johannine literature and biblical hermeneutics.

Biography 
Segovia holds a Bachelor of Arts from the Pontifical College Josephinum (1970), and an M.A. (1976) and Ph.D. (1978) from the University of Notre Dame. He was elected a member of the Catholic Biblical Association in 1974. He was a teaching assistant and lecturer in the theology department at Notre Dame from 1973–1977 and was assistant, then associate professor of theology at Marquette University from 1977–1984. Segovia joined the faculty of Vanderbilt University's Divinity School in 1984, first as associate, then as full professor. Segovia is past president of La Comunidad of Hispanic Scholars of Religion (of which he is also a founding member), of the Academy of Catholic Hispanic Theologians of the United States (ACHTUS), and of the Society of Biblical Literature (2014). He was the 1998 recipient of the Virgilio Elizondo Award from the ACHTUS.

Works

References

1948 births
Living people
American people of Cuban descent
Marquette University faculty
Vanderbilt University faculty
Pontifical College Josephinum alumni
University of Notre Dame alumni
American biblical scholars
Roman Catholic biblical scholars
New Testament scholars
World Christianity scholars
American religion academics
American Roman Catholic religious writers